Aubrey Lee Gatewood (November 17, 1938 – June 5, 2019) was an American professional baseball pitcher who appeared in 68 games over all or portions of four seasons for the Los Angeles/California Angels and Atlanta Braves of Major League Baseball.

Playing career
Gatewood was a graduate of North Little Rock High School and Arkansas State University. He signed with the Detroit Tigers in 1960 and won 11 games in his debut pro season, which was split between the Class C Northern League and Class B Carolina League. During the offseason, he was selected by the brand-new Los Angeles Angels with the 11th pick in the 1960 American League expansion draft. Gatewood struggled to a 3–10 record and a mediocre 4.64 earned run average for three teams ranging from Class B to Triple-A in 1961. But when Gatewood could not crack the Mets' maiden roster in spring training, he was offered back to the Angel organization, where he divided his 1962 campaign between Triple-A and Class B affiliates.

His campaign earned him a September call-up to the Angels for his first taste of major league service. In his first-ever MLB game, on September 11, 1963, he started against the Boston Red Sox at Chavez Ravine and earned a complete game, 4–1 victory. Gatewood permitted only four hits and one base on balls, striking out five. Gatewood had a shutout until the ninth inning, when Red Sox slugger Dick Stuart led off with a triple and scored two batters later on Russ Nixon's sacrifice fly. Gatewood would make another dozen starts as a big leaguer, but his MLB debut would witness his only career complete game. He appeared in four total games that September and out up a stellar ERA of 1.50 in 24 innings pitched.

He once again posted a strong earned run average (2.24, in 15 total games, including seven starts, and 60 innings pitched). That performance paved the way for Gatewood's only full year in the majors, . Working in 46 games, among them three starts, he won four of nine decisions and compiled a 3.42 ERA in 92 innings. But 1965 would be Gatewood's last year in an Angel uniform. Only during the midpoint of the  season would Gatewood again experience the major leagues, when he worked in three games in relief for the Atlanta Braves. His first two appearances as a Brave were effective ones; but in his third, on July 8, Gatewood allowed six runs (although only one was earned) in only one-third of an inning in a 13–0 pasting at the hands of the San Francisco Giants.

It was Gatewood's last game in the big leagues. During his 68-game MLB career, he compiled an 8–9 won–lost record and a 2.78 career earned run average; in 178 innings pitched, he permitted 166 hits and 67 bases on balls, striking out 75. Gatewood's last pro season was 1971. He died in North Little Rock on June 5, 2019.

References

External links
, or Venezuelan Winter League

1938 births
2019 deaths
American expatriate baseball players in Venezuela
Arkansas State Red Wolves baseball players
Arkansas State University alumni
Arkansas Travelers players
Atlanta Braves players
Baseball players from Arkansas
Buffalo Bisons (minor league) players
California Angels players
Dallas Rangers players
Des Moines Demons players
Duluth-Superior Dukes players
Durham Bulls players
El Paso Sun Kings players
Hawaii Islanders players
Los Angeles Angels players
Major League Baseball pitchers
Nashville Vols players
Portsmouth-Norfolk Tides players
Richmond Braves players
Rochester Red Wings players
Savannah Indians players
Shreveport Braves players
Sportspeople from Little Rock, Arkansas
Tacoma Cubs players
Tigres de Aragua players
Tri-City Braves players